Fiona Apple is an American singer-songwriter. She has released five studio albums: Tidal (1996), When the Pawn... (1999), Extraordinary Machine (2005), The Idler Wheel... (2012), and Fetch the Bolt Cutters (2020). Her first two albums were released through the record labels Clean Slate Records/Work Records. Tidal reached peak positions of number fifteen on the Billboard 200 and number two on Billboard Top Heatseekers chart. When the Pawn... peaked at number thirteen on the Billboard 200. Apple's third and fourth albums were released through Epic Records and continued to reach higher peak positions on the Billboard 200; Extraordinary Machine reached number seven and The Idler Wheel... reached number three. The digital album iTunes Originals – Fiona Apple was released via iTunes in February 2006 in the United States and December 2007 in the United Kingdom. Several of Apple's singles have charted in the US and on the UK Singles Chart, including "Shadowboxer", "Sleep to Dream", "Criminal" and "Fast as You Can". "Every Single Night" peaked at number 72 on Japan's Hot 100 Singles chart.

Apple's debut album earned her several recognitions, including the Grammy Award for Best Female Rock Vocal Performance for "Criminal" and the MTV Video Music Award for Best New Artist in a Video for "Sleep to Dream". For When the Pawn..., Apple received six nominations and won one, the California Music Award for Outstanding Female Vocalist. Of three nominations received for Extraordinary Machine, she won an Esky Music Award for Best Songbird. She won her second Grammy in 2021, when Fetch the Bolt Cutters won Best Alternative Music Album. Apple has received eleven nominations from the Grammy Awards, four from the Billboard Music Video Awards, and three each from the California Music Awards and MTV Video Music Awards. She has also been recognized by the mtvU Woodie Awards, the Shortlist Music Prize (known the year she was nominated as the New Pantheon Music Prize), and the VH1 Fashion Awards. As of 2013, Apple has received seven awards from 23 nominations.

ASCAP Pop Music Awards
The ASCAP Pop Music Awards honors the songwriters and publishers of the most performed pop songs. 

!Ref.
|-
| 1999
| "Criminal"
| Most Performed Song
| 
|

Billboard Music Video Awards
The Billboard Music Video Awards, which celebrate achievements of the music video industry, are sponsored by Billboard magazine. In 1997, the music video for Apple's "Sleep to Dream" received four nominations, including one for the Maximum Vision Award, which "honors the video that best advances an artist's career". The video also earned Stéphane Sednaoui a nomination for Director of the Year. In 2000, the music video for "Fast as You Can" earned Apple her second nominated in the category Best Clip of the Year. Apple has received one award from four nominations.

California Music Awards
Founded by now-defunct BAM magazine in 1977 as the Bay Area Music Awards, the "Bammies" were expanded and renamed in 1998 to honor musical excellence across California. Rather than being chosen by an academy, winners are decided by popular vote. Ballots were available in Tower Records stores and participants could also cast their votes online. Apple has received one award from three nominations for When the Pawn..., her second studio album.

Esky Music Awards
The Esky Music Awards are awarded annually by Esquire, a men's magazine by the Hearst Corporation. Apple has received one award from one nomination.

GAFFA Awards
The GAFFA Awards (Danish: GAFFA Prisen) have been awarded since 1991 by Danish magazine of the same name in the field of popular music.

|-
| rowspan=3|2021
| Fiona Apple
| Best International Solo Act
| 
|-
| Fetch the Bolt Cutters
| Best International Album
| 
|-
| "Ladies"
| Best International Hit
|

Gold Derby Music Awards

Grammy Awards

The Grammy Awards are awarded annually by the National Academy of Recording Arts and Sciences of the United States for outstanding achievements in the record industry. Often considered the highest music honor, the awards were established in 1958. All five of Apple's studio albums have earned her nominations, and she has twice been nominated in the Best Female Rock Vocal Performance and Best Rock Song categories. She has been nominated three times in Best Alternative Music Album. Overall, Apple has received three awards from eleven nominations.

MTV Video Music Awards
The MTV Video Music Awards were established by MTV in 1984 to recognize quality music videos. Apple has received two awards from three nominations.

mtvU Woodie Awards
mtvU is the 24-hour media network operated by MTV Networks, targeting college and university campuses across the United States. The mtvU Woodie Awards "honor and highlight the music voted 'best' by the US college audience", with winners determined by online voting. Apple has been nominated once.

Music Video Production Awards
The MVPA Awards are annually presented by a Los Angeles-based music trade organization to honor the year's best music videos.

|-
| 1998
| "Criminal"
| Best Styling 
| 
|-
| rowspan=6 | 2006
| rowspan="6" | "O, Sailor"
| Best Direction of a Female Artist 
| 
|-
| Best Hair 
| 
|-
| Best Art Direction 
| 
|-
| Best Cinematography
| 
|-
| Best Choreography
| 
|-
| Best Make-Up
|

Pollstar Concert Industry Awards

The Pollstar Concert Industry Awards is an annual award ceremony to honor artists and professionals in the concert industry.

|-
| 1997
| Herself 
| Best New Artist Tour
| 
|-
| 1998
| Tour
| Club Tour of the Year
|

Rober Awards Music poll

!Ref.
|-
| rowspan=5|2012
| rowspan=3|Herself
| Best Songwriter 
| 
| rowspan=5|
|-
| Return of the Year 
| 
|-
| Best Female Artist 
| 
|-
| The Idler Wheel...
| Album of the Year 
| 
|-
| "Every Single Night"
| Song of the Year
| 
|-
| rowspan=4|2020
| rowspan=2|Herself
| Best Female Artist
| 
| rowspan=4|
|-
| Songwriter of the Year
| 
|-
| Fetch the Bolt Cutters
| Album of the Year
| 
|-
| "I Want You to Love Me"
| Song of the Year
|

Shortlist Music Prize
The Shortlist Music Prize was an annual music award for the best album released in the United States that had sold fewer than 500,000 copies at the time of nomination. Established in 2001 as an alternative to the commercial Grammy Awards, recipients are chosen by a panel of entertainment industry members and journalists known as the "Listmakers". Over 50 of the best albums of the previous 12 months are picked before being narrowed down to the Shortlist, from which a winner is chosen. In 2005, the year Apple was nominated, the prize was renamed the New Pantheon Music Award following a dispute between its founders. Apple has been nominated once.

The Daily Californian Art Awards

!Ref.
|-
| 2020
| Fetch the Bolt Cutters
| Best Alternative Album
| 
|

VH1 Fashion Awards
The VH1 Fashion Awards, hosted by the American cable television network VH1, "honor the melding worlds of fashion and entertainment". Apple has received one award from two nominations.

Other recognitions
In 1997, Apple appeared on the cover of Rolling Stone, which would be included in its own 2009 list of "Hottest Covers". Reader's Poll results published in the January 1998 issue of the magazine revealed that Apple was voted "Best Female Performer". Robert Dimery included Tidal in his book, 1001 Albums You Must Hear Before You Die (2006). In 2007, the album was included at number 20 on Entertainment Weekly list of the "100 best albums from 1983 to 2008". Rolling Stone included Tidal as number 83 on its 2011 list of the "100 Best Albums of the Nineties". The Rolling Stone Reader's Poll for 2005 ranked Extraordinary Machine at number five for "Best Album"; in the same poll, Apple was ranked number three for "Best Female Performer" and number one for "Most Welcome Back". In 2011, the magazine included the album as number 49 on its list of the "100 Best Albums of the 2000s". In 2012, Apple's song "Dull Tool" was shortlisted, but failed to make the final list of nominees, for the Academy Award for Best Original Song.

References

External links
 Fiona Apple's official site

Awards and nominations
Apple, Fiona